Cosmeceuticals are cosmetic products with bioactive ingredients purported to have medical benefits.  In America, there are no legal requirements to prove that these products live up to their claims. The name is a portmanteau of "cosmetics"  and "pharmaceuticals".  Nutricosmetics are related dietary supplement or food or beverage products with additives that are marketed as having medical benefits that affect appearance.

Quasi-drug (labelled 医薬部外品 or 薬用) is a Japanese term that refer to many of the same products with functional claims, albeit regulation is stronger as pre-market approval from the Ministry of Health, Labour and Welfare is required.

Criticism
Consumers are willing to pay a premium for skin and hair care products that they perceive as high-performance. The term "cosmeceutical" is often used in cosmetic advertising and may be misleading to the consumer.  If the consumer interprets a "cosmeceutical" or "nutricosmetic" to be similar to a pharmaceutical product, he or she may conclude that cosmeceuticals are required to undergo the same testing for efficacy and quality control as required for medication.  This may allow the retailer to charge the consumer more for a product which may actually be less effective and/or of poorer quality than perceived.

However, according to the United States Food and Drug Administration (FDA), the Food, Drug, and Cosmetic Act "does not recognize any such category as "cosmeceuticals". A product can be a drug, a cosmetic, or a combination of both, but the term "cosmeceutical" has no meaning under the law".

Additionally, the FDA states that: "Food, Drug and Cosmetic Act defines drugs as those products that cure, treat, mitigate or prevent disease or that affect the structure or function of the human body. While drugs are subject to an intensive review and approval process by FDA, cosmetics are not approved by FDA prior to sale. If a product has drug properties, it must be approved as a drug."

To avoid inquiry and punitive action by the United States Federal Trade Commission, cosmeceuticals which do not intend to be regulated as drugs by the FDA are carefully labeled to avoid making statements which would indicate that the product has drug properties.  Any such claims made regarding the product must be substantiated by scientific evidence as being truthful.

Generally speaking, it is to the financial benefit of the cosmeceutical manufacturer that their products are not regulated by the FDA as drugs, because the FDA review process for drugs can be very costly and may not yield a legally marketable product if the FDA denies approval of the product.  However, as mentioned above, the reputation of the product may be falsely enhanced if the consumer incorrectly believes that a "cosmeceutical" is held to the same FDA standards as a drug.

See also
 Angel dusting
 Cosmetovigilance
 Nutraceutical

References

External links
Legal Affairs – Artfully Made-up
Cosmeceuticals – eMedicine.com

Further reading 
 
Cosmetics